Stanislaus "Stan" Valchek is a fictional character on the HBO drama The Wire, played by actor Al Brown, who died on January 13, 2023.

Biography

Valchek is the Polish-American commander of the Baltimore Police Department in the Southeastern district, home to many of the remaining ethnic white neighborhoods in Baltimore. More a politician than a policeman, he has ties with various Democratic organizations close to City Hall, most notably the politically influential developer Andrew Krawczyk. His political savvy helps him quickly ascend the ranks, though commanding officers such as Commissioner Ervin Burrell and Deputy Commissioner William Rawls dislike him. Valchek is Roland "Prez" Pryzbylewski's father-in-law.

Season 1

Valchek first appears in a meeting with Deputy Commissioner Burrell and Lieutenant Cedric Daniels, trying to smooth over Prez's drunken maiming of a fourteen-year-old. Valchek tells Daniels that if he helps Prez, Valchek will owe him a favor.

Season 2

Valchek pushes for an investigation into corruption at the docks, due to his petty feud with stevedore union treasurer Frank Sobotka. Both men want to donate stained glass windows to a local church, and Sobotka refuses to withdraw his larger, more expensive window which had been installed first. Curious as to how the struggling union can afford the window, Valchek has the cops in his district harass Sobotka and his union, having Ellis Carver ticket their cars for minor infractions and pulling them over for "random" DUI checkpoints directly outside the bar they frequent. The union steals Valchek's expensive surveillance van and ships it from port to port, sending him photographs from each destination.

Valchek discusses the union with Krawczyk, who knows of Sobotka making numerous campaign contributions. Valchek feels there could be illegal activity, while simultaneously noticing Burrell's nomination for Acting Commissioner. Knowing that Burrell has trouble finding support with the first district council members, Valchek offers Burrell political influence in exchange for a special unit devoted to investigating Sobotka, with Prez leading the investigation. Burrell has Rawls send an investigative team from CID who turn out to be dead-weight "humps." When Valchek witnesses the task force's lack of work ethic, he blackmails Burrell into providing him a real police detail led by Daniels.

As the investigation expands to cover Greek drug traffickers, Sobotka ceases to be the primary target. An angered Valchek goes to the FBI to try to refocus the investigation, but the Bureau remains more focused on the union than Sobotka. Valchek confronts Daniels' team, insulting and shoving Prez, who proceeds to punch Valchek in the face. Furious, he disowns Prez and threatens him with dismissal from the BPD. Daniels convinces him to reduce Prez's punishment, pointing out that any official action will have to mention that Valchek provoked the attack. Valchek grudgingly assigns Prez to two months on the midnight shift at the district's narcotics unit, and accepts a written apology to avoid charging him.

When the investigation ends, Valchek delights in personally arresting Sobotka, and holds him in the union offices until he can be publicly dragged out in front of the press. The aforementioned Greek drug traffickers later murder Sobotka keep him from turning state's evidence, but the surveillance van is still being shipped around the world. Although Valchek greatly hates Sobotka during the whole season, after Sobotka's death he whispers "Spoczywaj w pokoju" (Polish for "rest in peace").

Season 3 

Valchek sets up a meeting between Burrell and Tommy Carcetti, a city councilman from Valchek's district, knowing that Carcetti is doing deals behind Mayor Clarence Royce's back. When Royce pressures the BPD to lower crime rates in each district, Valchek announces plans to increase foot patrols in his district's housing projects, use more of his flex squads, request more overtime and "juke the stats" if all else fails.

Valchek is surprised and amused when Major Howard "Bunny" Colvin confronts Rawls and questions how to juke the stats with regard to dead bodies. He is amused by Colvin's proposal of drug legalization (ostensibly as a joke) to decrease the felonies in the Western District. Later, while pursuing a suspect, Prez accidentally kills a black plainclothes officer. Despite disowning him earlier, Valchek uses his influence to have the charges dismissed.

Season 4

After Thomas "Herc" Hauk, a member of Royce's security detail, catches the mayor receiving fellatio from a secretary, Valchek mentors him on exploiting the situation. After following Valchek's advice, Herc is promoted to sergeant. Valchek supports Carcetti for mayor, and leaks information about the murder of a state's witness that helps Carcetti best Royce in a debate. When Valchek leaks the news that Burrell has assigned rookie Kima Greggs on the state's witness case, the fallout leads to Royce deciding to fire Burrell as commissioner. Before this happens, Carcetti is elected Mayor and Burrell retains his position.

Carcetti informs Rawls that Valchek will be promoted to Deputy Commissioner of Administration for his loyalty, but asks Rawls to keep him from doing any damage. At the promotion ceremony, Valchek's wife Kate and daughter Joan are present while Prez is conspicuously absent. As departmental power shifts and Carcetti begins plotting to oust Burrell, Valchek reminds Rawls that Daniels, now promoted to Colonel, is more likely to replace Burrell as Commissioner because he is black.

Season 5

Valchek leaks the BPD's statistics on increased crime to Mayor Carcetti, urging that both Burrell and Rawls be fired. He also suggests that Carcetti promote him to Acting Commissioner until Daniels or another African-American is named to the permanent post. Carcetti and assistant Norman Wilson both agree that Valchek cannot deal with pressure from the City Council and the minister's alliance, even on an acting basis, but keep the statistics nonetheless. It is later revealed that Valchek is a prime source for Baltimore Sun reporter Roger Twigg.

Unable to take disciplinary action for a crime increase due to the department's lack of funding, Carcetti decides he will give Burrell a free pass assuming honest statistics are delivered. When Burrell, unaware that Valchek already released the actual crime stats, delivers juked stats showing no change in the crime rate, Carcetti is able to fire Burrell; he leaks a story to the Sun with Daniels' photograph to appease black voters about considering a change of commissioner.

In the series finale, Daniels is named Commissioner but resigns to prevent an FBI case against him from going public. Valchek is then promoted to the position of Commissioner (with a full five-year term) by new mayor Nerese Campbell. Valchek is not well regarded for his police work throughout the BPD, as mentioned by Leandor Sydnor when he visits Judge Daniel Phelan to get some back-channel pressure applied to a case and mentions how the current police commissioner "doesn't have an idea of what police work is".

References

The Wire characters
Fictional Democrats (United States)
Fictional Baltimore Police Department officers
Television characters introduced in 2002
American male characters in television
Fictional Polish-American people